"Walk by Faith" is a song by Jeremy Camp that reached No. 1 on the Hot Christian Songs Billboard chart. It is his second song to be made into a music video and is off Jeremy's first major-label studio album, released in 2002, called Stay. It later appeared on his second album, Carried Me: The Worship Project, in 2004. The song was written by Camp while he and his first wife, Melissa, were on their honeymoon.

References

2003 singles
Jeremy Camp songs
2002 songs
Songs written by Jeremy Camp